Luisa Bergalli (1703 in Venice - 1779 in Venice), was a Venetian writer and translator.

Bergalli was married to Gasparo Gozzi in 1738. She and her husband translated novels, plays and other work. She herself translated Terence and Jean Racine into Italian. 

Bergalli produced poems, compositions, comic and tragic plays as well as a novel, Le avventure del poeta, 1730.

References
 

1703 births
1779 deaths
18th-century Italian women writers
18th-century translators
18th-century Venetian writers
18th-century Venetian women
Members of the Academy of Arcadians